Thelma Hopkins may refer to:

Telma Hopkins (born 1948), actress
Thelma Hopkins (athlete) (born 1936), Northern Irish athlete